Herbert Hüttner (born 21 July 1942) is a German sailor. He competed in the Flying Dutchman event at the 1972 Summer Olympics.

References

External links
 

1942 births
Living people
German male sailors (sport)
Olympic sailors of East Germany
Sailors at the 1972 Summer Olympics – Flying Dutchman
Sportspeople from Schwerin